This is an (incomplete) list of films that won one or more Golden Globe Awards.

0–9
 12 Years a Slave (2013)
1917 (2019)

A
 About Schmidt (2002)
 The Accused (1988)
 The Actress (1953)
 Adaptation. (2002)
 The Adventures of Tintin: The Secret of the Unicorn (2011)
 The Age of Innocence (1993)
 Agnes of God (1985)
 Airport (1970)
 Aladdin (1992)
 The Alamo (1960)
 Alfie (2004)
 All the King's Men (1949)
 Almost Famous (2000)
 Amadeus (1984)
 American Beauty (1999)
 American Graffiti (1973)
 American Hustle (2013)
 An American in Paris (1951)
 America, America (1963)
 Anastasia (1956)
 Anna (1987)
 Anne of the Thousand Days (1969)
 Annie Hall (1977)
 The Apartment (1960)
 Apocalypse Now (1979)
 Argo (2012)
 Around the World in Eighty Days (1956)
 Arthur (1981)
 The Artist (2011)
 The Assault (a.k.a. De Aanslag, 1986)
 As Good as It Gets (1997)
 Atonement (2007)
 Auntie Mame (1958)
 Avanti! (1972)
 Avatar (2009)
 The Aviator (2004)
 Away from Her (2007)

B
 Babel (2006)
 Babe (1995)
 Baby Doll (1956)
 Babylon (2022)
 The Bad Seed (1956)
 The Banshees of Inisherin (2022)
 The Barefoot Contessa (1954)
 Barney's Version (2010)
 Battleground (1949)
 A Beautiful Mind (2001)
 Beauty and the Beast (1991)
 Becket (1964)
 Beginners (2011)
 Being the Ricardos (2021) 
 Being Julia (2004)
 Being There (1979)
 The Bells of St. Mary's (1945)
 Ben-Hur (1959)
 The Best Years of Our Lives (1946)
 The Big Country (1958)
 Big (1988)
 Bird (1988)
 Black Panther: Wakanda Forever (2022)
 Black Swan (2010)
 The Blind Side (2009)
 Blue Jasmine (2013)
 Blue Sky (1994)
 The Blue Veil (1951)
 Boogie Nights (1997)
 Borat: Cultural Learnings of America for Make Benefit Glorious Nation of Kazakhstan (2006)
 Born on the Fourth of July (1989)
 Born Yesterday (1950)
 Boys Don't Cry (1999)
 The Boy Friend (1971)
 Braveheart (1995)
 Breaking Away (1979)
 The Bridge on the River Kwai (1957)
 Brokeback Mountain (2005)
 Bugsy (1991)
 Bullets over Broadway (1994)
 Burlesque (2010)
 Buster (1988)
 Butch Cassidy and the Sundance Kid (1969)

C
 Cabaret (1972)
 Cactus Flower (1969)
 California Suite (1978)
 Call Me Madam (1953)
 Camelot (1967)
 Capote (2005)
 The Cardinal (1963)
 Carmen Jones (1954)
 Carnal Knowledge (1971)
 Career (1959)
 Casino (1995)
 Cast Away (2000)
 Cat Ballou (1965)
 Charly (1968)
 Chicago (2002)
 Children of a Lesser God (1986)
 Chinatown (1974)
 Cinderella Liberty (1973)
 City Slickers (1991)
 Closer (2004)
 Coal Miner's Daughter (1980)
 Cold Mountain (2003)
 The Collector (1965)
 The Color Purple (1985)
 Come Back, Little Sheba (1952)
 Coming Home (1978)
 The Constant Gardener (2005)
 The Country Girl (1954)
 Crazy Heart (2009)
 Creed (2015)
 Crimes of the Heart (1986)
 Crocodile Dundee (1986)
 Crouching Tiger, Hidden Dragon (2000)
 Cyrano de Bergerac (1950)

D
 Dallas Buyers Club (2013)
 Dances with Wolves (1990)
 The Dark Knight (2008)
 Death of a Salesman (1951)
 The Deer Hunter (1978)
 The Defiant Ones (1958)
 The Departed (2006)
 The Descendants (2011)
 The Devil Wears Prada (2006)
 Diary of a Mad Housewife (1970)
 Dirty Dancing (1987)
 The Diving Bell and the Butterfly (Le scaphandre et le papillon) (2007)
 Divorce, Italian Style (Divorzio all'italiana) (1962)
 Two Eyes, Twelve Hands (Do Aankhen Barah Haath) (1957)
 Doctor Dolittle (1967)
 Doctor Zhivago (1965)
 A Double Life (1947)
 Dreamgirls (2006)
 The Dresser (1983)
 Drive My Car (Doraibu mai kā) (2021)
 Driving Miss Daisy (1989)
 Dune (2021)

E
 East of Eden (1955)
 Educating Rita (1983)
 Ed Wood (1994)
 Elizabeth (1998)
 Elmer Gantry (1960)
 Elvis (2022)
 The Emigrants (Utvandrarna) (1972)
 Encanto (2021)
 Enchanted April (1992)
 The English Patient (1996)
 Equus (1977)
 Erin Brockovich (2000)
 E.T. the Extra-Terrestrial (1982)
 Europa Europa (1990)
 Everything Everywhere All at Once (2022)
 Evita (1997)
 Exodus (1960)
 The Exorcist (1973)

F
 The Fabelmans (2022)
 The Fabulous Baker Boys (1989)
 The Fall of the Roman Empire (1964)
 Farinelli (1994)
 Fiddler on the Roof (1971)
 The Fighter (2010)
 The Fisher King (1991)
 Five Easy Pieces (1970)
 Flashdance (1983)
 Forrest Gump (1994)
 For the Boys (1991)
 For Whom the Bell Tolls (1943)
 Four Weddings and a Funeral (1994)
 The French Connection (1971)
 The French Lieutenant's Woman (1981)
 Frida (2002)
 From Here to Eternity (1953)
 The Fugitive (1993)
 Funny Girl (1968)

G
 Gandhi (1982)
 Gangs of New York (2002)
 Gaslight (1944)
 Gentleman's Agreement (1947)
 Georgy Girl (1966)
 Get Shorty (1995)
 Ghost (1990)
 Gigi (1958)
 Girl, Interrupted (1999)
 Gladiator (2000)
 Glory (1989)
 The Godfather (1972)
 Gods and Monsters (1998)
 Going My Way (1944)
 The Goodbye Girl (1977)
 Goodbye, Mr. Chips (1969)
 Good Morning, Vietnam (1987)
 Good Will Hunting (1997)
 Gorillas in the Mist (1988)
 Gosford Park (2001)
 The Graduate (1967)
 The Greatest Show on Earth (1952)
 The Great Gatsby (1974)
 Green Card (1990)
 The Guns of Navarone (1961)
 Guys and Dolls (1955)
 Gypsy (1962)

H
 Hamlet (1948)
 The Hangover (2009)
 Hannah and Her Sisters (1986)
 Happy-Go-Lucky (2008)
 Harry and Tonto (1974)
 Harvey (1950)
 The Hateful Eight (2015)
 Hawaii (1966)
 Heaven Can Wait (1978)
 Heaven & Earth (1993)
 The Heiress (1949)
 The Help (2011)
 The High and the Mighty (1954)
 High Noon (1951)
 Hope and Glory (1987)
 The Hospital (1971)
 The Hours (2002)
 The House I Live In (1945)
 Howards End (1992)
 Hugo (2011)
 The Hurricane (1999)
 Hush… Hush, Sweet Charlotte (1964)

I
 I Remember Mama (1944)
 I Want to Live! (1958)
 I'm Not There (2007)
 The Idolmaker (1980)
 Imitation of Life (1959)
 Inglourious Basterds (2009)
 Inside Daisy Clover (1965)
 Inside Out (2015)
 The Inspector General (1949)
 In a Better World (2010)
 In Bruges (2008)
 In the Bedroom (2001)
 In the Heat of the Night (1967)
 Into the Wild (2007)
 Iris (2001)
 Irma la Douce (1963)
 The Iron Lady (2011)
 Islam (1978)
 It's a Wonderful Life (1946)

J
 Jacqueline Susann's Once Is Not Enough (1975)
 Jaws (1975)
 Jerry Maguire (1996)
 JFK (1991)
 Johnny Belinda (1948)
 Jonathan Livingston Seagull (1973)
 Joy (2015)
 Judgment at Nuremberg (1961)
 Julia (1977)
 Julie & Julia (2009)

K
 The Kids Are All Right (2010)
 The Killing Fields (1984)
 The King and I (1956)
 King Richard (2021)
 The King's Speech (2010)
 Klute (1971)
 Kramer vs. Kramer (1979)

L
 L.A. Confidential (1997)
 La La Land (2016)
 La Vie En Rose (La môme) (2007)
 The Last Emperor (1987)
 The Last King of Scotland (2006)
 The Last Picture Show (1971)
 Lawrence of Arabia (1962)
 Leaving Las Vegas (1995)
 The Legend of 1900 (1998)
 Les Girls (1957)
 Life with Father (1947)
 Lilies of the Field (1963)
 The Lion in Winter (1968)
 The Lion King (1994)
 The Little Mermaid (1989)
 The Little Prince (1974)
 Little Voice (1998)
 The Longest Yard (1974)
 Longtime Companion (1990)
 The Lord of the Rings: The Return of the King (2003)
 Lost in Translation (2003)
 The Lost Weekend (1945)
 Love Story (1970)
 Lust for Life (1956)
 The L-Shaped Room (1963)

M
 Madame Sousatzka (1988)
 Magnolia (1999)
 A Majority of One (1961)
 The Manchurian Candidate (1962)
 A Man and a Woman (1966)
 A Man for All Seasons (1966)
 Man on the Moon (1999)
 Marathon Man (1976)
 The Martian (2015)
 Marty (1955)
 Mary Poppins (1964)
 MASH (1970)
 A Medal for Benny (1945)
 Melvin and Howard (1980)
 Memoirs of a Geisha (2005)
 Me, Natalie (1969)
 Me and the Colonel (1958)
 Micki + Maude (1984)
 Midnight Express (1978)
 Mighty Aphrodite (1995)
 Miracle on 34th Street (1947)
 The Mirror Has Two Faces (1996)
 Misery (1990)
Missing Link (2019)
 The Mission (1986)
 Mister 880 (1950)
 Mogambo (1953)
 Mona Lisa (1986)
 Monster (2003)
 Moonstruck (1987)
 The Moon Is Blue (1953)
 Moulin Rouge! (2001)
 Mourning Becomes Electra (1947)
 Mrs Brown (1997)
 Mrs. Doubtfire (1993)
 Mrs. Parkington (1944)
 The Music Man (1962)
 Mystic River (2003)
 My Fair Lady (1964)
 My Six Convicts (1952)
 My Week with Marilyn (2011)

N
 Network (1976)
 A Night to Remember (1959)
 The Ninth Configuration (1980)
 No Country for Old Men (2007)
 Norma Rae (1979)
 Nurse Betty (2000)

O
 An Officer and a Gentleman (1982)
 Oliver! (1968)
 One Flew Over the Cuckoo's Nest (1975)
Once Upon a Time in Hollywood (2019)
 Only When I Laugh (1981)
 On Golden Pond (1981)
 On the Beach (1959)
 On the Riviera (1951)
 On the Waterfront (1954)
 Ordinary People (1980)
 Osama (2003)
 Out of Africa (1985)
 O Brother, Where Art Thou? (2000)

P
 The Painted Veil (2006)
 Pal Joey (1957)
 The Paper Chase (1973)
 A Passage to India (1984)
 Patton (1970)
 Pennies from Heaven (1981)
 The People vs. Larry Flynt (1996)
 Philadelphia (1993)
 The Piano (1993)
 Picnic (1955)
 The Picture of Dorian Gray (1945)
 Places in the Heart (1984)
 A Place in the Sun (1951)
 Platoon (1986)
 The Player (1992)
 Pocahontas (1995)
 Pocketful of Miracles (1961)
 Porgy and Bess (1959)
 The Poseidon Adventure (1972)
 The Power of the Dog (2021)
 Precious (2009)
 Pretty Woman (1990)
 Primal Fear (1996)
 The Prince of Tides (1991)
 Prizzi's Honor (1985)
 Psycho (1960)
 Pulp Fiction (1994)
 The Pumpkin Eater (1964)
 The Purple Rose of Cairo (1985)

Q
 The Queen (2006)
 Quo Vadis (1951)

R
 Rachel, Rachel (1968)
 Raging Bull (1980)
 The Rainmaker (1956)
 Rain Man (1988)
 Ray (2004)
 The Razor's Edge (1946)
 The Reader (2008)
 Reds (1981)
 The Red Shoes (1948)
 The Revenant (2015)
 Reversal of Fortune (1990)
 Revolutionary Road (2008)
 Richard III
 The Robe (1953)
 Rocky (1976)
 Romancing the Stone (1984)
 Roman Holiday (1953)
 Room (2015)
 A Room with a View (1986)
 Rosemary's Baby (1968)
 The Rose Tattoo (1955)
 The Rose (1979)
 The Royal Tenenbaums (2001)
 RRR (2022)
 Runaway Train (1985)
 Running on Empty (1988)
 The Russians Are Coming, the Russians Are Coming (1966)
 Ryan's Daughter (1970)

S
 Same Time, Next Year (1978)
 The Sand Pebbles (1966)
 Saving Private Ryan (1998)
 Sayonara (1957)
 Scent of a Woman (1992)
 Schindler's List (1993)
 Scrooge (1970)
 The Sea Inside (a.k.a. Mar adentro, 2004)
 The Secret of Santa Vittoria (1969)
 Secrets & Lies (1996)
 Sense and Sensibility (1995)
 Separate Tables (1958)
 A Separation (2011)
 September Affair (1951)
 Serpico (1973)
 Seven Days in May (1964)
 The Seven Year Itch (1955)
 Shaft (1971)
 Shakespeare in Love (1998)
 The Sheltering Sky (1990)
 Sherlock Holmes (2009)
 Shine (1996)
 The Shoes of the Fisherman (1968)
 Sideways (2004)
 The Silence of the Lambs (1991)
 Silkwood (1983)
 Singin' in the Rain (1952)
 Sister Kenny (1946)
 Slumdog Millionaire (2008)
 The Social Network (2010)
 Something's Gotta Give (2003)
 Some Like It Hot (1959)
 Son of Saul (2015)
 The Song of Bernadette (1943)
 Song Without End (1960)
 Sons and Lovers (1960)
 Sophie's Choice
 The Sound of Music (1965)
 Spartacus (1960)
 Spectre (2015)
 The Spy Who Came in from the Cold (1965)
 Star! (1968)
 A Star Is Born (1954)
 A Star Is Born (1976)
 Star Wars Episode IV: A New Hope (1977)
 Stay Hungry (1976)
 Steel Magnolias (1989)
 Steve Jobs (2015)
 A Streetcar Named Desire (1951)
 The Stunt Man (1980)
 Suddenly, Last Summer (1959)
 Summer and Smoke (1961)
 Sunrise at Campobello (1960)
 Sunset Boulevard (1950)
 The Sunshine Boys (1975)
 Sweeney Todd: The Demon Barber of Fleet Street (2007)
 Sweet Bird of Youth (1962)
 Syriana (2005)

T
 Tár (2022)
 Tender Mercies (1983)
 Terms of Endearment (1983)
 That Touch of Mink (1962)
 Thelma & Louise (1991)
 There Will Be Blood (2007)
 They Shoot Horses, Don't They? (1969)
 The Three Faces of Eve (1957)
 Three Little Words (1950)
 The Three Musketeers (1973)
 Thoroughly Modern Millie (1967)
 Titanic (1997)
 Tommy (1975)
 Tom Jones (1963)
 Tootsie (1982)
 Too Young to Kiss (1951)
 Top Gun (1986)
 A Touch of Class (1973)
 The Towering Inferno (1974)
 Toy Story 2 (1999)
 Toy Story 3 (2010)
 To Bed or Not to Bed (1963)
 To Die For (1995)
 To Kill a Mockingbird (1962)
 Traffic (2000)
 Transamerica (2005)
 The Treasure of the Sierra Madre (1948)
 Trial (1955)
 True Grit (1969)
 True Lies (1994)
 The Truman Show (1998)
 The Turning Point (1977)
 Tucker: The Man and His Dream (1988)
 Tumbleweeds (1999)
 Twelve Monkeys (1995)
 Twilight new moon(2009)

U
 Ulee's Gold (1997)
 Unforgiven (1992)
 Up (2009)
 Up in the Air (2009)
 The Untouchables (1987)

V
 Vicky Cristina Barcelona (2008)
 Victor Victoria (1982)
 The V.I.P.s (1963)
 Voyage of the Damned (1976)

W
 A Walk in the Clouds (1995)
 Walk the Line (2005)
 Wall Street (1987)
 WALL-E (2008)
 Waltz with Bashir (2008)
 Watch on the Rhine (1943)
 W.E. (2011)
 West Side Story (1961)
 West Side Story (2021)
 What's Love Got to Do with It (1993)
 The Whisperers (1967)
 The White Ribbon (2009)
 Wilson (1944)
 With a Song in My Heart (1952)
 Witness for the Prosecution (1957)
 A Woman Under the Influence (1974)
 Working Girl (1988)
 The Wrestler (2008)

X
 none

Y
 The Yearling (1946)
 Yentl (1983)

Z

 Zootopia (2017)

By year

 (1943) For Whom the Bell Tolls (1943) The Song of Bernadette (1943) Watch on the Rhine (1944) Gaslight (1944) Going My Way (1944) Mrs. Parkington (1944) Wilson (1945) The Bells of St. Mary's (1945) The House I Live In (1945) The Lost Weekend (1945) A Medal for Benny (1945) The Picture of Dorian Gray (1946) It's a Wonderful Life (1946) Sister Kenny (1946) The Best Years of Our Lives (1946) The Razor's Edge (1946) The Yearling (1947) A Double Life (1947) Gentleman's Agreement (1947) Life with Father (1947) Miracle on 34th Street (1947) Mourning Becomes Electra (1948) Hamlet (1948) I Remember Mama (1948) Johnny Belinda (1948) The Red Shoes (1948) The Treasure of the Sierra Madre (1949) All the King's Men (1949) Battleground (1949) The Heiress (1949) The Inspector General (1950) Born Yesterday (1950) Cyrano de Bergerac (1950) Harvey (1950) Mister 880 (1950) Sunset Boulevard (1950) Three Little Words (1951) A Place in the Sun (1951) A Streetcar Named Desire (1951) An American in Paris (1951) Death of a Salesman (1951) High Noon (1951) On the Riviera (1951) Quo Vadis (1951) September Affair (1951) The Blue Veil (1951) Too Young to Kiss (1952) Come Back, Little Sheba (1952) My Six Convicts (1952) Singin' in the Rain (1952) The Greatest Show on Earth (1952) With a Song in My Heart (1953) Call Me Madam (1953) From Here to Eternity (1953) Mogambo (1953) Roman Holiday (1953) The Actress (1953) The Moon Is Blue (1953) The Robe (1954) A Star Is Born (1954) Carmen Jones (1954) On the Waterfront (1954) The Barefoot Contessa (1954) The Country Girl (1954) The High and the Mighty (1955) East of Eden (1955) Guys and Dolls (1955) Marty (1955) Picnic (1955) Richard III (1955) The Rose Tattoo (1955) The Seven Year Itch (1955) Trial (1956) Anastasia (1956) Around the World in Eighty Days (1956) Baby Doll (1956) Lust for Life (1956) The Bad Seed (1956) The King and I (1956) The Rainmaker (1957) Les Girls (1957) Pal Joey (1957) Sayonara (1957) The Bridge on the River Kwai (1957) The Three Faces of Eve (1957) Witness for the Prosecution (1958) Auntie Mame (1958) Gigi (1958) I Want to Live! (1958) Me and the Colonel (1958) Separate Tables (1958) The Big Country (1958) The Defiant Ones (1959) A Night to Remember (1959) Ben-Hur (1959) Career (1959) Imitation of Life (1959) On the Beach (1959) Porgy and Bess (1959) Some Like It Hot (1959) Suddenly, Last Summer (1960) Elmer Gantry (1960) Exodus (1960) Psycho (1960) Song Without End (1960) Sons and Lovers (1960) Spartacus (1960) Sunrise at Campobello (1960) The Alamo (1960) The Apartment (1961) A Majority of One (1961) Judgment at Nuremberg (1961) Pocketful of Miracles (1961) Summer and Smoke (1961) The Guns of Navarone (1961) West Side Story (1962) Divorce, Italian Style (1962) Gypsy (1962) Lawrence of Arabia (1962) Sweet Bird of Youth (1962) That Touch of Mink (1962) The L-Shaped Room (1962) The Manchurian Candidate (1962) The Music Man (1962) To Kill a Mockingbird (1963) America, America (1963) Irma la Douce (1963) Lilies of the Field (1963) The Cardinal (1963) The V.I.P.s (1963) To Bed or Not to Bed (1963) Tom Jones (1964) Becket (1964) Hush… Hush, Sweet Charlotte (1964) Mary Poppins (1964) My Fair Lady (1964) Seven Days in May (1964) The Fall of the Roman Empire (1964) The Pumpkin Eater (1965) Cat Ballou (1965) Doctor Zhivago (1965) Inside Daisy Clover (1965) The Collector (1965) The Sound of Music (1965) The Spy Who Came in from the Cold (1966) A Man and a Woman (1966) A Man for All Seasons (1966) Georgy Girl (1966) Hawaii (1966) The Russians Are Coming, the Russians Are Coming (1966) The Sand Pebbles (1967) Camelot (1967) Doctor Dolittle (1967) In the Heat of the Night (1967) The Graduate (1967) The Whisperers (1967) Thoroughly Modern Millie (1968) Charly (1968) Funny Girl (1968) Oliver! (1968) Rachel, Rachel (1968) Rosemary's Baby (1968) Star! (1968) The Lion in Winter (1968) The Shoes of the Fisherman (1969) Anne of the Thousand Days (1969) Butch Cassidy and the Sundance Kid (1969) Cactus Flower (1969) Goodbye, Mr. Chips (1969) Me, Natalie (1969) The Secret of Santa Vittoria (1969) They Shoot Horses, Don't They? (1969) True Grit (1970) Airport (1970) Diary of a Mad Housewife (1970) Five Easy Pieces (1970) Love Story (1970) MASH (1970) Patton (1970) Ryan's Daughter (1970) Scrooge (1971) Carnal Knowledge (1971) Fiddler on the Roof (1971) Klute (1971) Shaft (1971) The Boy Friend (1971) The Emigrants (1971) The French Connection (1971) The Hospital (1971) The Last Picture Show (1972) Avanti! (1972) Cabaret (1972) The Godfather (1972) The Poseidon Adventure (1973) A Touch of Class (1973) American Graffiti (1973) Cinderella Liberty (1973) Jonathan Livingston Seagull (1973) Serpico (1973) The Exorcist (1973) The Paper Chase (1973) The Three Musketeers (1974) A Woman Under the Influence (1974) Chinatown (1974) Harry and Tonto (1974) The Great Gatsby (1974) The Little Prince (1974) The Longest Yard (1974) The Towering Inferno (1975) Jacqueline Susann's Once Is Not Enough (1975) Jaws (1975) One Flew Over the Cuckoo's Nest (1975) The Sunshine Boys (1975) Tommy (1976) A Star Is Born (1976) Marathon Man (1976) Network (1976) Rocky (1976) Stay Hungry (1976) Voyage of the Damned (1977) Annie Hall (1977) Equus (1977) Julia (1977) Star Wars Episode IV: A New Hope (1977) The Goodbye Girl (1977) The Turning Point (1978) California Suite (1978) Coming Home (1978) Heaven Can Wait (1978) Islam (1978) Midnight Express (1978) Same Time, Next Year (1978) The Deer Hunter (1979) Apocalypse Now (1979) Being There (1979) Breaking Away (1979) Kramer vs. Kramer (1979) Norma Rae (1979) The Rose (1980) Coal Miner's Daughter (1980) Melvin and Howard (1980) Ordinary People (1980) Raging Bull (1980) The Idolmaker (1980) The Ninth Configuration (1980) The Stunt Man (1981) Arthur (1981) On Golden Pond (1981) Only When I Laugh (1981) Pennies from Heaven (1981) Reds (1981) The French Lieutenant's Woman (1982) An Officer and a Gentleman (1982) E.T. the Extra-Terrestrial (1982) Gandhi (1982) Sophie's Choice (1982) Tootsie (1982) Victor Victoria (1983) Educating Rita (1983) Flashdance (1983) Silkwood (1983) Tender Mercies (1983) Terms of Endearment (1983) The Dresser (1983) Yentl (1984) A Passage to India (1984) Amadeus (1984) Micki + Maude (1984) Places in the Heart (1984) Romancing the Stone (1984) The Killing Fields (1985) Agnes of God (1985) Out of Africa (1985) Prizzi's Honor (1985) Runaway Train (1985) The Color Purple (1985) The Purple Rose of Cairo (1986) A Room with a View (1986) Children of a Lesser God (1986) Crimes of the Heart (1986) Crocodile Dundee (1986) The Assault (De aanslag) (1986) Hannah and Her Sisters (1986) Mona Lisa (1986) Platoon (1986) The Mission (1986) Top Gun (1987) Anna (1987) Dirty Dancing (1987) Good Morning, Vietnam (1987) Hope and Glory (1987) Moonstruck (1987) The Last Emperor (1987) The Untouchables (1987) Wall Street (1988) Big (1988) Bird (1988) Buster (1988) Gorillas in the Mist (1988) Madame Sousatzka (1988) Rain Man (1988) Running on Empty (1988) The Accused (1988) Tucker: The Man and His Dream (1988) Working Girl (1989) Born on the Fourth of July (1989) Driving Miss Daisy (1989) Glory (1989) Steel Magnolias (1989) The Fabulous Baker Boys (1989) The Little Mermaid (1990) Dances with Wolves (1990) Europa Europa (1990) Ghost (1990) Green Card (1990) Longtime Companion (1990) Misery (1990) Pretty Woman (1990) Reversal of Fortune (1990) The Sheltering Sky (1991) Beauty and the Beast (1991) Bugsy (1991) City Slickers (1991) For the Boys (1991) JFK (1991) The Fisher King (1991) The Prince of Tides (1991) The Silence of the Lambs (1991) Thelma & Louise (1992) Aladdin (1992) Enchanted April (1992) Howards End (1992) Scent of a Woman (1992) The Player (1992) Unforgiven (1993) Heaven & Earth (1993) Mrs. Doubtfire (1993) Philadelphia (1993) Schindler's List (1993) The Age of Innocence (1993) The Fugitive (1993) The Piano (1993) What's Love Got to Do with It (1994) Blue Sky (1994) Bullets over Broadway (1994) Ed Wood (1994) Farinelli (1994) Forrest Gump (1994) Four Weddings and a Funeral (1994) Pulp Fiction (1994) The Lion King (1994) True Lies (1995) A Walk in the Clouds (1995) Babe (1995) Braveheart (1995) Casino (1995) Get Shorty (1995) Leaving Las Vegas (1995) Mighty Aphrodite (1995) Pocahontas (1995) Sense and Sensibility (1995) To Die For (1995) Twelve Monkeys (1996) Jerry Maguire (1996) Primal Fear (1996) Secrets & Lies (1996) Shine (1996) The English Patient (1996) The Mirror Has Two Faces (1996) The People vs. Larry Flynt (1997) As Good as It Gets (1997) Boogie Nights (1997) Evita (1997) Good Will Hunting (1997) L.A. Confidential (1997) Mrs Brown (1997) Titanic (1997) Ulee's Gold (1998) Elizabeth (1998) Gods and Monsters (1998) Little Voice (1998) Saving Private Ryan (1998) Shakespeare in Love (1998) The Legend of 1900 (1998) The Truman Show (1999) American Beauty (1999) Boys Don't Cry (1999) Girl, Interrupted (1999) Magnolia (1999) Man on the Moon (1999) The Hurricane (1999) Toy Story 2 (1999) Tumbleweeds (2000) Almost Famous (2000) Cast Away (2000) Crouching Tiger, Hidden Dragon (2000) Erin Brockovich (2000) Gladiator (2000) Nurse Betty (2000) O Brother, Where Art Thou? (2000) Traffic (2001) A Beautiful Mind (2001) Gosford Park (2001) In the Bedroom (2001) Iris (2001) Moulin Rouge! (2001) The Royal Tenenbaums (2002) About Schmidt (2002) Adaptation. (2002) Chicago (2002) Frida (2002) Gangs of New York (2002) The Hours (2003) Cold Mountain (2003) Lost in Translation (2003) Monster (2003) Mystic River (2003) Osama (2003) Something's Gotta Give (2003) The Lord of the Rings: The Return of the King (2004) Alfie (2004) Being Julia (2004) Closer (2004) Million Dollar Baby (2004) Ray (2004) Sideways (2004) The Aviator (2004) The Sea Inside [Mar adentro] (2005) Brokeback Mountain (2005) Capote (2005) Memoirs of a Geisha (2005) Syriana (2005) The Constant Gardener (2006) Babel (2006) Borat: Cultural Learnings of America for Make Benefit Glorious Nation of Kazakhstan (2006) Cars (2006) The Departed (2006) The Devil Wears Prada (2006) Dreamgirls (2006) The Last King of Scotland (2006) Letters from Iwo Jima (2006) The Painted Veil (2006) The Queen (2007) Atonement (2007) Away from Her (2007) The Diving Bell and the Butterfly [Le scaphandre et le papillon] (2007) I'm Not There (2007) Into the Wild (2007) No Country for Old Men (2007) Ratatouille (2007) Sweeney Todd: The Demon Barber of Fleet Street (2007) There Will Be Blood (2007) La Vie en Rose [La môme] (2008) The Dark Knight (2008) Happy-Go-Lucky (2008) In Bruges (2008) The Reader (2008) Revolutionary Road (2008) Slumdog Millionaire (2008) Vicky Cristina Barcelona (2008) WALL-E (2008) Waltz with Bashir [Vals im Bashir] (2008) The Wrestler (2009) Avatar (2009) The Blind Side (2009) Crazy Heart (2009) The Hangover (2009) Inglourious Basterds (2009) Julie & Julia (2009) Precious (2009) Sherlock Holmes (2009) Up (2009) Up in the Air (2009) The White Ribbon [Das weiße Band] (2010) Barney's Version (2010) Black Swan (2010) Burlesque (2010) The Fighter (2010) In a Better World [Hævnen] (2010) The Kids Are All Right (2010) The King's Speech (2010) The Social Network (2010) Toy Story 3 (2011) The Adventures of Tintin: The Secret of the Unicorn (2011) The Artist (2011) Beginners (2011) The Descendants (2011) The Help (2011) Hugo (2011) The Iron Lady (2011) My Week with Marilyn (2011) A Separation [Jodái-e Náder az Simin] (2011) W.E. (2012) Argo (2012) Love [Amour] (2012) Brave (2012) Django Unchained (2012) Life of Pi (2012) Lincoln (2012) Les Misérables (2012) Silver Linings Playbook (2012) Skyfall (2012) Zero Dark Thirty (2013) 12 Years a Slave (2013) All Is Lost (2013) American Hustle (2013) Blue Jasmine (2013) Dallas Buyers Club (2013) Frozen (2013) Gravity (2013) The Great Beauty [La grande bellezza] (2013) Her (2013) Mandela: Long Walk to Freedom''

 Films
Lists of films by award